Louis Bennett Field  is a private-use airport located  north of the central business district of Weston, in Lewis County, West Virginia, United States. It is privately owned by West Virginia University.

The airport is named in honor of Weston native Louis Bennett Jr., a pilot with the Royal Flying Corps during World War I.

Facilities 
It has one asphalt paved runway designated 1/19 which measures 3,195 x 50 feet (974 x 15 m).

References

External links 
 Louis Bennett Field at the West Virginia Airport Directory
 

Airports in West Virginia
Buildings and structures in Lewis County, West Virginia
University and college airports
West Virginia University
Transportation in Lewis County, West Virginia